() is a county under the jurisdiction of the prefecture-level city of Quanzhou, Fujian, People's Republic of China. It is situated in the middle of the Fujian coast, between Quanzhou and Meizhou Bay. The county has a population of 921,794, as of late 2003, with a non-agricultural population of 289,396 people. The dialect is Hui'an dialect, related to Hokkien.

Administrative divisions
The county is divided into fifteen towns and one ethnic township. The only township in the county is Baiqi Hui Ethnic Township.

Towns:
, the county seat (the location marked on most maps as "Hui'an")
Luòyáng, 
Chongwu, 
Dongyuan, 
Zhangban, 
Dongling, 
Wangchuan,
Tuzhai,
Luóyáng, 
Huangtang, 
Shanxia, 
Jingfeng, 
Dongqiao, 
Zishan, 
Xiaozuo

Economy

Hui'an people have long been engaged in quarrying local granite and using it for construction purposes. Traditional houses and other structures in the region are constructed from long narrow blocks of granite.

These days, Hui'an's stone workers have built on their experience by becoming manufacturers of stone statuary for China's temples, public places, businesses, and private residences. These days, the  road (Huichong Highway) between the Hui'an County seat and the town of Chongwu is practically lined up with production plants and showrooms of stone-working companies, statues of all kinds displayed in front of them.

Footwear manufacturing is developed in a number of towns in the western part of the county, closer to Quanzhou.

Dali Foods Group has its headquarters in Hui'an County.

Transportation

Although a lot fewer trains stop at Hui'an than at major stations such as Quanzhou, there is a train in each direction every hour or two during the day. There is no night service.

The freight-only Zhangping–Quanzhou–Xiaocuo Railway runs south of the county seat.

References

County-level divisions of Fujian
Quanzhou